İncesu is a village in the Sason District, Batman Province, Turkey. The village is populated by Arabs and had a population of 177 in 2021.

References

Villages in Sason District

Arab settlements in Batman Province